Li Hongqi may refer to:
 Lee Hong-chi (born 1990), Taiwanese actor
 Thomas Hong-Chi Lee (born 1945), Taiwanese-American historian